Naram Garam is a 1981 Bollywood comedy-drama film directed by Hrishikesh Mukherjee. The film was produced by Subhash Gupta and Uday Narayan Singh and had music by R. D. Burman. It reprises many actors and actresses from the 1979 hit Gol Maal with the same names. It was also directed by Hrishikesh Mukherjee and starred Amol Palekar in the lead and Utpal Dutt won filmfare award best comic role .Plot elements of this movie have been used in the 1985 Malayalam comedy Aram + Aram = Kinnaram.

Plot
Naram Garam is the story of Kusum (Swaroop Sampat) and her father (A.K. Hangal), who are left homeless due to non-repayment of debts from the local money lender. They are helped by Ramprasad (Amol Palekar), who is in love with Kusum. Bhavani Shankar (Utpal Dutt), Ramprasad's employer, is feared by his family members and employees, but is himself terrified of his own mother-in-law (Dina Pathak). Ramprasad helps Bhavani Shankar get the possession of his ancestral home after a 53-year-long legal battle with a squatter and is therefore assigned the responsibility of getting the house back in shape so that it can be re-occupied. In the meanwhile, Kusum and her father come to the shelter of Ramprasad and start staying in the house. Ramprasad doesn't have a house of his own, hence decides to let them stay illegally until he can find an alternative.

When this comes to the knowledge of the estate manager, Gajanan Babu (Suresh Chatwal), he arrives furious and determined to oust the squatters. However, he succumbs to the charms of Kusum and instead of ousting the old man and his daughter, presents a proposal of marriage. Horrified, Kusum and Ramprasad turn to Kali Shankar, a.k.a. Babua (Shatrughan Sinha), Bhavani Shankar's younger brother, for help. Babua is a garage mechanic and a ruffian with a kind heart for women in distress. He successfully dissuades Gajanan Babu from carrying through with his proposal, but is also determined to oust Kusum and her father. However, he too is captivated by Kusum's beauty and presses his suit. Then Ramprasad finally turns to Bhavani Shankar, who dissuades Babua using his younger brother's fear of him.

Bhavani Prasad comes to his home to oust the illegal residents, but is captivated by Kusum's voice and beauty. Being a very superstitious man and a faithful believer of astrologers, Bhavani Prasad believes that Kusum is the reincarnation of his dead wife Ahilya
. He decides to marry Kusum. Ramprasad finds the situation becoming very sticky, but decides to play along.

Bhavani Shankar takes all the precautions to make sure the marriage would take place secretly, only with Ramprasad's knowledge. However, Ramprasad invites Bhavani Shankar's mother-in-law and daughter to come to the house at exact date and time of the marriage, without telling them of the marriage itself. Bhavani Shankar now finds himself in a flux, not having the courage to get married in their presence. He secretly convinces Ramprasad to marry Kusum instead. Ramprasad negotiates his salary and the house in return of the deal. Thus, Ramprasad and Kusum finally get married and the reality behind the whole affair remains undiscovered.

Cast
Amol Palekar as Ram Prasad
Swaroop Sampat as Kusum
Shatrughan Sinha as Kali Shankar Bajpai "Babua"
Utpal Dutt as Bhavani Shankar Bajpai
A. K. Hangal as Vishnu Prasad "Masterji"
Kiran Vairale as Sumitra 
Suresh Chatwal as Gajanan
Javed Khan Amrohi as Chandu
Padma Chavan as Ratna
Anand as Birju
Dina Pathak as Naniji (Special Appearance)
Om Prakash as Shastriji (Special Appearance)
Nilu Phule as Guruji (Special Appearance)
Meena Roy (Special Appearance)
Devi Chand as Devichand

Soundtrack

External links 
 

1981 films
1980s Hindi-language films
Films scored by R. D. Burman
Films directed by Hrishikesh Mukherjee
Squatting in film